Rosetta is an American post-metal band from Philadelphia, Pennsylvania incorporating elements of post-hardcore, shoegazing, drone, post-rock, avant-garde and ambient, with influences as diverse as Neurosis and Isis, My Bloody Valentine, Frodus, and Stars of the Lid. The band somewhat humorously self-describes its music as "metal for astronauts", and its members are very interested in astronomy and space travel.

Biography
Rosetta's members were all acquaintances in high school, and had played in various bands until they decided to play a last minute gig on August 20, 2003, after only three practice sessions, and improvised the entire show. Following this, they proceeded to write more songs, play more shows, and eventually record a four-song demo album, which picked up interest from Translation Loss Records. The band's name does not come from the Rosetta Stone.

Their debut album, The Galilean Satellites, featured two separate hour-long discs (one of more metal-oriented music, and one of ambience) that synchronize together. Although originally intended to be one disc of metal tracks sandwiched by ambient ones, the band had enough material to cover two discs.

The band's second release, Project Mercury, a split with Balboa, was released April 24, 2007. After a full United States tour in July, the band's second full-length album, entitled Wake/Lift, was released on October 2, again through Translation Loss. The release of Wake/Lift was accompanied by selected United States touring and followed by a June 2008 Australian tour.

Rosetta's third full-length album, named A Determinism of Morality, was released on May 25, 2010, and was followed in the summer by the band's first full U.S. tour in three years.  In October, the band released a split LP with Philadelphia band Restorations, on Cavity Records, featuring a previously unreleased track which had been recorded in December 2007.

In 2012 the band announced their return to Europe in July, followed by their second Australia tour. The tour was accompanied by a split release with touring partners City Of Ships, released by Australian independent label Bird's Robe Records.

Discography
Studio albums
 The Galilean Satellites (Translation Loss, 2005)
 Wake/Lift (Translation Loss, 2007)
 A Determinism of Morality (Translation Loss, 2010)
 The Anaesthete (self released, 2013) 
 Quintessential Ephemera (self released, 2015)
 Utopioid (self released, 2017)

EPs
 The Cleansing Undertones of Wake/Lift (Translation Loss, 2007)
 Flies to Flame (Translation Loss, 2014)
Sower of Wind (self released, 2019)
Terra Sola (self released, 2019)

Soundtrack
 Rosetta: Audio/Visual Original Score  (self released, 2015)

Splits
 Project Mercury with Balboa (Level Plane, 2007)
 Three way split with Year of No Light and East of the Wall (Translation Loss, 2009)
 Split with Restorations (Cavity Records, 2010)
 Junius / Rosetta with Junius (Translation Loss Records / The Mylene Sheath, 2011)
 City of Ships / Rosetta (Bird's Robe Records, July 2012)

Compilations
 A Dead-Ender's Reunion (self released, 2016)

Demos
 Demo (self-released, 2004)

Members
 Michael Armine – lead vocals, keyboards, synthesizers, samples, effects (2003–present)
 David Grossman – bass guitar, backing vocals (2003–present)
 Bruce McMurtrie Jr. – drums (2003–present)
 J. Matthew Weed – guitar, violin, piano, backing vocals (2003–present)
 Eric Jernigan – guitar, backing vocals (2014–present)

References

External links
 
 Rosetta at Twitter
 Translation Loss Records
 Rosetta at AllMusic Guide

Musical groups established in 2003
2003 establishments in Pennsylvania
Heavy metal musical groups from Pennsylvania
Rock music groups from Pennsylvania
Musical groups from Philadelphia
American post-metal musical groups
American sludge metal musical groups
American space rock musical groups
American post-rock groups
Musical quintets